Jake Angeli (born Jacob Anthony Angeli Chansley; 1988), also known as the QAnon Shaman, Q Shaman, and Yellowstone Wolf, is an American alt-right conspiracy theorist and activist who participated in the January 6 attack on the United States Capitol, for which he was convicted of felony charges of obstructing an official proceeding. He has been a supporter of President Donald Trump and a believer and disseminator of the QAnon conspiracy theory.

Angeli attended demonstrations in the Phoenix, Arizona, area starting around 2019 in particular in march for climate. At rallies, he promoted conspiracy theories supporting Trump, and he has been a counterprotestor at Black Lives Matter events. His appearance, with face paint utilizing the colors and symbols of the American flag and a headdress made of animal fur, helped to establish his shaman nicknames.

After being photographed taking part in the January 6 storming of the Capitol, Angeli was arrested on January 9 on federal charges of "knowingly entering or remaining in any restricted building or grounds without lawful authority, and with violent entry and disorderly conduct on Capitol grounds". He is currently serving out his sentence at  Federal Correctional Institution - Safford in Safford, Arizona, and has a July 9, 2023, release date.

Early life and education 
Jake Angeli was born in 1988, to Martha Chansley. He attended Moon Valley High School in Phoenix, Arizona, and Glendale Community College, where he completed some coursework in psychology, religion, philosophy, and ceramics.

Career 
Angeli enlisted in the United States Navy on September 26, 2005. After boot camp and training as a supply clerk, he was assigned to the aircraft carrier USS Kitty Hawk in March 2006. At some point, he refused to take an anthrax vaccine and was scheduled for dismissal from the Navy. On September 29, 2007, he was sent to a Transient Personnel Unit in Puget Sound in Washington state, and was processed out of the Navy on October 11. After two years and 15 days in uniform, his final rank was Storekeeper Seaman Apprentice. His military awards and decorations include the National Defense Service Medal, the Global War on Terrorism Service Medal, the Sea Service Deployment Ribbon and the Navy and Marine Corps Overseas Service Ribbon.

Angeli self-published two books: Will & Power: Inside the Living Library (Volume 1), published in 2017 under the pen name Loan Wolf; and One Mind at a Time: A Deep State of Illusion, published in 2020 under the name Jacob Angeli. He produced and narrated 11 videos espousing various conspiracy theories and uploaded them to the platform Rumble in late 2020.

Angeli had a profile on the Backstage website seeking work as an actor.

Activism 

Angeli was formerly a supporter of Donald Trump, has a social media following and has attended rallies supporting QAnon, mostly in and around Phoenix. At various rallies in Arizona, he shouted about QAnon conspiracy theories and carried a sign that says "Q Sent Me".

In 2019 Angeli frequently protested alone outside the Arizona Capitol, espousing various conspiracy theories. He was reported as a shamanic practitioner when attending a climate activism protest in Arizona and his ideology has been described as ecofascist. In early 2020 he told The Arizona Republic that he began wearing a fur hat and face paint to attract attention so that he could then talk about QAnon and "other truths". He appeared at a Black Lives Matter (BLM) protest in the Phoenix area in order to spread the QAnon conspiracy theory.

Following the 2020 United States presidential election, Angeli's protests focused on challenging the results of the vote in Arizona. He camped outside the Maricopa County Courthouse during the vote counting process, and gave a speech at a rally there on November 7, the day that president-elect Joe Biden announced his win, declaring, "This election has not been called! Don't believe that lie! They got their hands caught in the cookie jar and we're going to the Supreme Court! Trump always looks like he's going to lose. And then he wins."

Participation in the 2021 Capitol attack 

During the January 6 United States Capitol attack, Angeli entered the Senate floor in the Capitol, wearing his "shamanic" attire, including a bison-horned fur headdress, and war paint in red, white, and blue, as well as carrying a  spear, with an American flag tied below the spear head. He was also photographed standing on the raised platform in front of Vice President Mike Pence's chair, gaining him significant media attention. He later said police had initially blocked the crowd from entry, but had then specifically allowed them entry, at which point he entered. On March 16, 2021, the U.S. District Court in Washington D.C. released previously unseen video footage of Angeli entering the Capitol building after windows were smashed. 

In March 2023, video footage presented by Tucker Carlson on Fox News depicted Angeli walking through the Capitol building in the company of police officers who appeared to make no visible effort to stop him. Carlson, who was given exclusive access to the security footage by a top congressional Republican, characterized the officers as "tour guides" for Angeli and noted that none of the officers arrested him. U.S. Capitol Police Chief Tom Manger denounced Carlson's segment, calling the show "filled with offensive and misleading conclusions." Manger specifically took issue with Carlson's claim that Capitol Police officers acted as "tour guides" for Angeli. He maintained that Capitol Police officers were badly outnumbered and did their best to use de-escalation tactics to try to talk rioters into leaving the building. Angeli's attorney claimed to have no prior knowledge of the footage, noting that the government is obligated to disclose all evidence--especially exculpatory evidence--and that here the government failed to do so. Nonetheless, because he pleaded guilty, it remains unclear whether this error could cause court proceedings to be affected.

Court transcripts reveal Angeli told the FBI that he had traveled to the Capitol "as a part of a group effort, with other 'patriots' from Arizona, at the request of the President that all 'patriots' come to DC on January 6, 2021". Prior to the Capitol being invaded, Angeli called out for the demonstrators to pause and join him in prayer, saying, "Thank you for allowing the United States to be reborn. We love you and we thank you. In Christ's holy name, we pray." After the riot, Angeli told reporters, "The fact that we had a bunch of our traitors in office hunker down, put on their gas masks and retreat into their underground bunker, I consider that a win."

On January 8, Angeli was posted as a person of interest with the Washington DC Police. Interviewed while wanted, Angeli said that he believed he did nothing wrong, telling NBC: "I walked through an open door, dude." On January 8, Angeli told KPNX that he "wasn't worried" about possible charges. Angeli had no criminal record in Arizona before taking part in the riot.

Arrest and criminal proceedings 
On January 9, Angeli was arrested and brought up on U.S. federal charges of "knowingly entering or remaining in any restricted building or grounds without lawful authority, and with violent entry and disorderly conduct on Capitol grounds". A Capitol police special agent was quoted as saying that he identified Angeli by his "unique attire and extensive tattoos covering his arms and left side of his torso". Angeli voluntarily spoke to the Washington Field Office of the FBI prior to his arrest. In a January 14 court filing, federal prosecutors said that Angeli had left a note on Pence's desk in the Senate chamber that said "It's only a matter of time, justice is coming."

While jailed awaiting trial, Angeli refused to eat because the food served was not organic. Subsequently, a court ordered that he receive organic food.

Beginning in January 2021 through his guilty plea on September 2, Angeli was represented by St. Louis attorney Albert Watkins. In a written statement, Watkins argued that Angeli had no part in the violence, did not hide his identity, was unarmed, not destructive, and followed the instructions of law enforcement officials in a respectful fashion; and that Angeli was carrying a megaphone so his voice could be heard. Additionally, he presented evidence Angeli had been diagnosed with schizotypal personality disorder while serving the Navy. He also said in an interview with KSDK in St. Louis, "[Angeli] is responsible for his actions. He regrets where he is today". Watkins publicly called on President Trump to pardon his client, arguing that Angeli had been unarmed, not violent, and not destructive, and had been acting on the "invitation" of the president. Later in January, Angeli made overtures for a presidential pardon from Trump through White House Chief of Staff Mark Meadows. When the pardon was not granted, Watkins said, "He (Angeli) regrets very very much having not just been duped by the President, but by being in a position where he allowed that duping to put him in a position to make decisions he should not have made." According to Watkins, Angeli was prepared to testify against Trump in his second impeachment trial. However, the trial ended with Trump's acquittal without any witnesses being called.

On March 8, 2021, federal judge Royce Lamberth ruled that Angeli should not be released from jail, saying his lawyer's arguments were "so frivolous as to insult the Court's intelligence". In a written statement, the judge said the "defendant does not fully appreciate the severity of the allegations against him."

On September 3, 2021, Angeli pleaded guilty to a single count of obstructing an official proceeding and agreed to accept the prosecution's recommended sentence of 41 to 51 months in prison as part of the settlement. Earlier, his lawyer said Angeli broke away from QAnon and asked that it no longer be used in terms for him. Judge Lamberth turned down a request for release (Angeli wanted to visit his grandfather while Watkins wanted to provide him with shelter and care for his mental health) on the grounds that there was no convincing evidence that there would not be any risk of escape.

On November 17, Angeli was sentenced to 41 months in prison. He is currently serving out his sentence at  Federal Correctional Institution - Safford in Safford, Arizona, and has a July 9, 2023, release date.

Disinformation about affiliation and role 

After the storming of the Capitol, pro-Trump users on Facebook circulated false rumors that Angeli was not a Trump supporter and right-wing advocate but was instead associated with antifa and the Black Lives Matter (BLM) movement and had infiltrated the event as an agent provocateur. Those false reports frequently included a photo of Angeli at a BLM rally in Arizona, cropping out his "Q Sent Me" sign that indicates he was a counter-protester rather than a participant at the rally.

In a January 6 tweet from his Twitter account, @USAwolfpack, Angeli contradicted speculations made by Trump campaign lawyer Lin Wood: "Mr. Wood. I am not antifa or blm. I'm a Qanon & digital soldier. My name is Jake & I marched with the police & fought against BLM & ANTIFA in PHX." Snopes investigated the statement, concluding that he did attend a BLM rally, that he is not affiliated with Antifa, and was an active Trump supporter.

There was also disinformation propagated which falsely claimed Angeli colluded with Nancy Pelosi's son-in-law, Michiel Vos, seen in a photo with him outside the U.S. Capitol Building. Snopes wrote that Vos is a reporter with the Dutch free-to-air television channel RTL, and the image is from a story on the protests which Vos wrote for the Dutch news program RTL Boulevard.

Views 
Angeli has stated his beliefs that televisions and radios emit "very specific frequencies that are inaudible," that "affect the brain waves of your brain". He has also spoken about the Bilderberg conspiracy theory and said that Freemasons designed Washington, D.C. according to "ley lines" that amplify the Earth's magnetic field. During a 2020 interview on ORF, Angeli declared that "in order to beat this evil occultic force you need a light occultic force … [you need] a force that is of the side of God, of love … almost like on the side of the angels … as opposed to the demons." In reflecting on the Capitol storming, Angeli said that "What we did on January 6 in many ways was an evolution in consciousness, because as we marched down the street along these ley lines shouting 'USA' or shouting things like 'freedom'... we were actually affecting the quantum realm."

Prosecutors have alleged that Angeli believes he is an alien or higher being and is destined to ascend to another reality.

When asked about her son's views in 2021, Martha Chansley told KNXV-TV that "it takes a lot of courage to be a patriot".

In popular culture 
An animated Angeli appears in the 2021 "South ParQ Vaccination Special" episode of South Park, in which he becomes a home school tutor for "Tutornon". Likewise, a character dressed in attire similar to Angeli's appears in a 2021 episode of It's Always Sunny in Philadelphia titled "2020: A Year In Review", as well as in a 2021 episode of Reno 911!. In January 2022, Will Forte's character MacGruber appeared dressed as Angeli on an episode of Saturday Night Live. In July 2022, during season 3 of The Boys, one member of the Stormchasers, supporters of Nazi superhero Stormfront, is dressed like Angeli.

References 

1980s births
Living people
Convicted participants in the January 6 United States Capitol attack
American conspiracy theorists
Hunger strikers
Internet memes
Internet memes introduced in 2021
Criminals from Arizona
Critics of Black Lives Matter
People with schizotypal personality disorder
United States Navy sailors
Year of birth uncertain
QAnon
Alt-right activists